Bristol buses may refer to
 Bristol, the make of bus made by Bristol Commercial Vehicles
 Bristol, the trading name of Bristol Omnibus Company, which operated buses in Bristol, Gloucestershire and parts of Somerset and Wiltshire in England
Buses in Bristol, bus services operated in Bristol, England